Pachyanthus is a thorny shrub with edible berries in the genus of plant in family Melastomataceae.

Species include:
 Pachyanthus pedicellatus Urban

 
Melastomataceae genera
Taxonomy articles created by Polbot